Güneyxırman (formerly known as Guneykaler) is a village in the Khojavend District of Azerbaijan.

References 

Populated places in Khojavend District